Aranaiyur is a village situated in the Sivagangai District in the Indian state of Tamil Nadu. It is near the towns of Paramakudi and Ilaiyangudi and has a population of 1348 people.

Notable people
Seeman

References

Cities and towns in Sivaganga district